The 1916 Central Michigan Normalites football team represented Central Michigan Normal School, later renamed Central Michigan University, as an independent during the 1916 college football season. In their first and only season under head coach Blake Miller, the Central Michigan football team compiled a 1–5 record and were outscored by their opponents by a combined total of 139 to 39. The team played only three intercollegiate games, losing twice to Alma College (0–39, 0–44) and once to the Michigan Agricultural frosh team (0–14). The team's only victory was by a 39–0 score against West Branch High School.

Schedule

References

Central Michigan
Central Michigan Chippewas football seasons
Central Michigan Normalites football